Hailstone typically refers to a piece of hail.

Hailstone may also refer to:

Hailstone (surname), list of people with the surname
Operation Hailstone, a 1944 American military operation against Japan

See also
Collatz conjecture, also known as the hailstone sequence
Hail (disambiguation)